The Scoundrel's Wife (U.S. video title: The Home Front) is a 2002 romantic drama film directed by Glen Pitre, who co-wrote screenplay with Michelle Benoit, and starring by Tatum O'Neal, Julian Sands and Tim Curry.

Plot
The Scoundrel's Wife tells the story of a woman suspected of being a saboteur, who struggling to raise two children in a small village during World War II. The film is a period drama which takes place in Louisiana at the beginning of U.S. entry into World War II. A certain military is looking for the Germans who are sinking America's ships off the coast and fishermen who are trading goods.

Cast
Tatum O'Neal as  Camille Picou 
Julian Sands  as  Doctor Lenz 
Tim Curry  as  Father Antoine 
Lacey Chabert  as  Florida Picou 
Eion Bailey  as  Ensign Jack Burwell 
Patrick McCullough  as  Blue Picou 
Rudolf Martin  as  Neg Picou 
Lorna Farrar  as  Shrimp Shed Owner 
John McConnell  as  Dance Hall Owner 
Lance Spellerberg  as Beaten P.W. 
Kurt Gerard  as  Snake-bit P.W. 
Michael Arata  as  Coast Guard Commander

External links
 
 
 

2002 films
Films directed by Glen Pitre
2002 romantic drama films
American romantic drama films
2000s English-language films
2000s American films